Khoroshensky is a rural locality (a khutor) in Upornikovskoye Rural Settlement, Nekhayevsky District, Volgograd Oblast, Russia. The population was 110 as of 2010. There are 3 streets.

Geography 
Khoroshensky is located on the Kalach Upland, on the Akishevka River, 17 km south of Nekhayevskaya (the district's administrative centre) by road. Pankinsky is the nearest rural locality.

References 

Rural localities in Nekhayevsky District